"No Time to Lose" is a rock song performed by English-Australian rock group Tarney/Spencer Band from their album Run for Your Life (1979). It was originally released in March 1979 through A&M Records, with a shorter re-release in 1981, during a period when the music video was enjoying substantial airplay on MTV. The song was written by Alan Tarney and Trevor Spencer, and produced by David Kershenbaum.  The song charted twice on the United States Billboard Hot 100 chart with each of its releases.

Chart performance

References

1979 singles
1981 singles
A&M Records singles
1979 songs
Songs written by Alan Tarney